Danny Clark may refer to:

Danny Clark (baseball) (1894–1937), American baseball player
Danny Lee Clark (born 1964), American actor, best known for American Gladiators
Danny Clark (cyclist) (born 1951), Australian racing cyclist and Olympic medalist
Danny Clark (American football) (born 1977), American football player
Danny Clark (born 1990) Bournemouth

See also

Dan Clark (disambiguation)
Daniel Clark (disambiguation)